Şorəlli (also, Shorally) is a village and municipality in the Barda Rayon of Azerbaijan.  It has a population of 931.

References

Populated places in Barda District